Ondřej Švejdík (born 3 December 1982) is a Czech footballer who plays for FC Slavoj Vyšehrad. His former teams are SFC Opava, Bohemians Prague, FK Mladá Boleslav, FC Groningen, FK Dukla Prague and FC Slovan Liberec.

Career

Early career
Švejdík went to school in Opava, where he began his football life as a junior player. Between 1998 and 2001, Švejdík represented the Czech Republic at youth international level, playing for teams up to the under-18 level. He played at the 2001 UEFA European Under-18 Football Championship. During this time he played club football in the Czech First League for SFC Opava.

Švejdík left Opava and joined Bohemians in August 2002.

Švejdík played 24 games in the 2005–06 Czech First League as FK Mladá Boleslav finished the season in second place, qualifying for the following season's UEFA Champions League.

Netherlands
Švejdík left FK Mladá Boleslav in 2006, joining Dutch side FC Groningen in the Eredivisie on a four-year contract. He played for Groningen in the 2006–07 UEFA Cup, making his competition debut on 14 September 2006 in the 4–2 first round loss against Serbian side Partizan Belgrade.

At Groningen, Švejdík suffered a couple of injuries including breaking his arm in 2007 and undergoing surgery for a knee problem in 2009.

Return to the Czech Republic
After being released by Groningen, Švejdík returned to the Czech Republic in 2011, joining AC Sparta Prague as a free agent.

Švejdík moved to FK Dukla Prague on loan for the 2011–12 Czech First League.

References

External links
 
 
 

1982 births
Living people
Sportspeople from Opava
Association football central defenders
Czech footballers
Czech Republic youth international footballers
Czech First League players
SFC Opava players
FK Mladá Boleslav players
Bohemians 1905 players
FK Dukla Prague players
Eredivisie players
FC Groningen players
FC Slovan Liberec players
MŠK Žilina players
FK Viktoria Žižkov players
FK Slavoj Vyšehrad players
Czech expatriate footballers
Expatriate footballers in the Netherlands
Czech expatriate sportspeople in the Netherlands
Czech expatriate sportspeople in Slovakia
Czech National Football League players
Slovak Super Liga players
Expatriate footballers in Slovakia